V1974 Cygni or Nova Cygni 1992 was a nova, visible to the naked eye, in the constellation Cygnus.
It was discovered visually with 10×50 binoculars on February 19, 1992, by Peter Collins, an amateur astronomer living in Boulder, Colorado. At that time he first noticed it, it had an apparent magnitude of 7.2.   Nine hours later he saw it again, and it had brightened by a full magnitude. For this discovery Collins was awarded the AAVSO Nova Award in 1993.   The nova reached magnitude 4.4 at 22:00 UT on 22 February 1992.  Images from the Palomar Sky Survey taken before the nova event showed identified a possible precursor which had photographic magnitudes of 18 (blue light) and 17 (red light), but the identification of the precursor is not firm.

V1974 Cygni declined from peak brightness by three magnitudes in 43 days, making it a "fast" nova.  Its light curve is classified as type P (Plateau), and it may be a recurrent nova.

In 1995, V1974 Cygni was observed with the Very Large Array at 1.49, 4.9, 8.4, 14.9 and 22.5 GHz. It was also studied with the Hubble Space Telescope instrument the High Speed Photometer. The instrument recorded a short amount of  ultraviolet photometry. The nova was also observed in the far-ultraviolet by Voyager 2.
It was observed, but not detected, with the Compton Gamma Ray Observatory.
It was the first nova to be observed throughout the electromagnetic spectrum, from radio waves to γ-rays.

All novae are binary stars, with a "donor" star orbiting a white dwarf.   The two stars are so close to each other that matter is transferred from the donor to the white dwarf. In the case of V1974 Cygni, the binary's orbital period is 1 hour, 57 minutes.   The nova has an oxygen-neon-magnesium white dwarf primary, making it a neon nova.  Estimates of the mass of the white dwarf range from 0.98  to 1.12, and it is estimated to be acquiring  of material from the donor star.

V1974 Cygni has a nova remnant shell which has been observed several times with the Hubble Space Telescope, as well as with the Infrared Space Observatory.   The shell is nearly circular, and its radius as of 10 February 1998 was 0.983 arc seconds.   It is expanding at a rate of about 0.26 milli arc seconds per day.   The remnant was also imaged in 6 cm radio waves with the MERLIN interferometer.

See also
 Nova Cygni 1975

References

External links
 https://web.archive.org/web/20050915104557/http://www.tsm.toyama.toyama.jp/curators/aroom/var/nova/1990.htm
 http://www.aavso.org/v1974-cyg-nova-cygni-1992

Cygni, V1974
Novae
Cygnus (constellation)
1992 in science